The J. Tawes Historical Museum is located on the Somers Cove Marina, Crisfield, Maryland, United States.  The museum focuses on the history of the Lower Shore region, including the local people, towns and industry.

See also
J. Millard Tawes (54th Governor of Maryland)

Footnotes

External links
J. Millard Tawes Historical Museum.  Webpage from The Crisfield Heritage Foundation website.

Museums in Somerset County, Maryland
History museums in Maryland